Alexander Jesse Norman (born 23 June 1962) is a British Conservative Party politician, who has served as Minister of State for Decarbonisation and Technology since October 2022. He previously served as Minister of State for the Americas and the Overseas Territories from September to October 2022. He served as Financial Secretary to the Treasury from 2019 to 2021. He has been the Member of Parliament (MP) for Hereford and South Herefordshire since 2010.

Norman was a director at Barclays before leaving the City in 1997 to research and teach at University College London. Prior to that he ran an educational charity in Eastern Europe during and after the Communist era. Despite his unconventional past, Norman was identified by Bruce Anderson, formerly political editor of The Spectator, in January 2013 as a potential future Leader of the Conservative Party.

Norman was first elected as the Conservative MP for Hereford and South Herefordshire at the 2010 general election, having been selected as his party's candidate by open primary in December 2006. He chaired the Culture, Media and Sport Committee from 2015 to 2016. Following Theresa May's appointment as Prime Minister in July 2016, Norman was appointed Parliamentary Under-Secretary of State for Industry and Energy. Norman was appointed Parliamentary Under-Secretary of State for Transport after the 2017 general election, before advancing to Minister of State at the same department in November 2018. In May 2019, Norman was appointed Paymaster General and Financial Secretary to the Treasury by May; he remained in the latter position under her successor, Boris Johnson, until he stepped down in September 2021. In September 2022, he returned to government, having been appointed Minister of State for the Americas and the Overseas Territories by new Prime Minister Liz Truss, before  moving back to the Department for Transport in October 2022.

Early life and education
Norman is the son of Sir Torquil Norman and his wife Lady Elizabeth Montagu (daughter of the 10th Earl of Sandwich), the paternal grandson of Air Commodore Sir Nigel Norman, 2nd Bt, CBE, and the great-grandson of Sir Henry Norman, 1st Bt. He and his sons are therefore in remainder to the Norman baronetcy.

Norman was educated at Eton College and Merton College, Oxford, graduating with a Second in Classics.

Career

Academic
Norman pursued further studies at University College London, where he was appointed an Honorary Research Fellow in philosophy, taking an MPhil in 1999 and a PhD in 2003. He also lectured in philosophy at University College and Birkbeck. He was elected as a Visiting Fellow at All Souls College, Oxford in 2016-17, and a Two-Year Fellow in 2022.

Charity 
From 1989-91 Norman ran a charitable project donating new medical textbooks and journals and business and other books and building independent professional networks across Poland, Hungay, Czechoslovakia and Ukraine.

He has also served on the boards of the Hay Festival, the Kindle Centre in Hereford and the Friends of St Mary's Ross-on-Wye.

Banking
Norman worked for Barclays from 1991 to 1997.

Think tanks and writing
He was a Senior Fellow at Policy Exchange and writes regularly for the national press. His book Compassionate Conservatism (2006), co-written with Janan Ganesh, has been described as "the guidebook to Cameronism" by The Sunday Times. Its successor, Compassionate Economics, was favourably reviewed by Daniel Hannan. His other policy publications include "Living for the City" (2006) and "From Here to Fraternity" (2007).

In 2007, Norman founded the Conservative Co-operative Movement.

His books include The Achievement of Michael Oakeshott (ed.) (1992), Breaking the Habits of a Lifetime (1992) and After Euclid (2006); The Big Society: The Anatomy  of the New Politics (2010), published by University of Buckingham Press.

His biography of Edmund Burke, which was long-listed for the 2013 Samuel Johnson Prize for Non-Fiction, and described as "A must-read for anyone interested in politics and history" by the Sunday Telegraph.

His book Adam Smith: What He Thought, and Why It Matters (2018), won the Parliamentary non-fiction book award in 2018.,  and was described as "superb" in the Financial Times. 

His first novel, The Winding Stair, about the rivalry between Francis Bacon and Edward Coke, is due to be published in June 2023.

Political career
At the 2006 local elections in Camden, Norman was one of the three Conservative candidates for Camden Town with Primrose Hill ward. However, he was unsuccessful, in what was a close contest between the Labour and Liberal Democrat parties.

Norman won the new seat of Hereford and South Herefordshire at the 2010 general election with a 5.1% majority over the Liberal Democrats, who had held the predecessor constituency. He was a member of the Treasury Select Committee from July 2010 to March 2015, is Chairman of the All-Party Parliamentary Group on Employee Ownership, founder of the PFI Rebate Campaign and founding member of the Campaign for an Effective Second Chamber which campaigns for the House of Lords to be appointed rather than elected.

On 10 July 2012, Norman was identified as a ringleader of the rebellion over the House of Lords Reform package presented to the House of Commons. On the vote being overturned, Government Whips suggested to David Cameron that before the debate "Norman had spread a rumour to rally rebels" the Prime Minister was in reality unenthusiastic about the reforms. Immediately after the intensive debate, culminating in a narrow Government defeat by Labour's rejection of the Lords Election proposals as tabled, Cameron is reported to have confronted Norman in the Members' Lobby telling him that such "conduct [misrepresenting Cameron to rally Lords Reform dissenters] was 'not honourable'"; Norman then withdrew in the direction of the Members' Bar but allegedly was immediately stopped and escorted from the Palace of Westminster by four Whips. A spokesman denied that there had been a heated argument, saying that Cameron had merely told Norman he had misrepresented his views. 

On 11 July 2012, Ed Miliband, the then leader of the Labour Party, described the scene involving Cameron and Norman as "fisticuffs in the Lobby" at Prime Minister's Questions. Accounts of the severity of Cameron's words or gestures used vary and The Daily Telegraph wrote that cynics say this "public argument may have been staged" to try to prove to Liberal Democrats that Cameron shared their vision of Lords Reform. Norman rebutted much of this narrative in an article for The Spectator.

In 2013, Norman said that so many Old Etonians were in government positions because of Eton's "ethos" of public service that "other schools don't imbue the same commitment". Later on Twitter, Norman said his comments were "defending one institution, not attacking others". Norman describes his educational background as following "an educational argument between my mother, who despised any form of privilege, and my father, who took the view that he had set up his own business, so he was entitled to spend money on his kids' education".

Norman was dismissed from Downing Street's Policy Board after rebelling against the Government again in opposition to military intervention in Syria.

On 27 June 2014, prior to the nomination of Jean-Claude Juncker to the presidency of the European Commission, Norman gave his wholehearted support of Cameron's stance, as being "absolutely right ... in opposing Mr Juncker". He argued that the EU constitution requires elected heads to choose its "President" and secondly that Juncker's manifesto fails to tackle what he (Norman) sees as the President's duty to address the unpopularity of EU mandates. Norman also said that democracy, for the British, involves legitimacy derived from the ballot box, whereas for some Europeans, it involves centralised bureaucracy.

In September 2014, Norman raised the issue of rules concerning football club ownership in the House of Commons, alleging the then-Chairman of Hereford United had a criminal conviction, in support of Supporters Trust's campaign to oust the Agombar régime at Hereford Utd FC. On 19 December 2014, the club was wound up in the High Court.

Chairman of the Culture, Media and Sport Committee
On 19 June 2015, his election as Chairman of the Culture, Media and Sport Committee was announced.

On 8 September 2015 at a hearing of the Culture, Media and Sport Select Committee convened to discuss recent allegation of blood doping in athletics, Norman said the following "When you hear the London Marathon, potentially the winners or medallists at the London Marathon, potentially British athletes are under suspicion for very high levels of blood doping... " thus seemingly using parliamentary privilege to implicate Paula Radcliffe as being involved, since she is the only British London Marathon winner since 1996. This prompted Radcliffe to respond with a statement denying any involvement in doping, though Norman said it was not his intention to implicate any individual.

Financial Secretary 
After serving as Energy Minister and then Roads Minister, Norman served as Financial Secretary to the Treasury from May 2019-September 2021. During that time, he managed the UK Pandemic Furlough and self-employed schemes, launched a 10 year strategy to digitize the tax system, and set up the UK Infrastructure Bank. He stepped down in September 2021.

Brexit
Almost alone among MP's, Norman has never revealed publicly how he voted over the UK's continued membership of the European Union in the 2016 referendum saying only, "A referendum is not an act of representative government and I am not a minister, so my vote can properly be a private one." He set out his view of Brexit in an Op-Ed "To get this EU debate out of the sewer, it needs the Pulp Fiction treatment"

Other views
In 2017, Norman expressed support for fellow Old Etonian Jacob Rees-Mogg to lead the party. Norman subsequently felt obliged to contact the newspaper concerned to say that his was a light-hearted response to a question in an interview about whether Rees-Mogg would make a good candidate and he was not backing him.

Honours
In November 2019, he was appointed as a member of the Privy Council.

Personal life
In 1992, Norman married Kate Bingham, only daughter of The Lord Bingham of Cornhill, KG, the former Lord Chief Justice. Bingham is known for leading the Johnson government's COVID-19 Vaccine Taskforce. They have two sons and one daughter.

Norman lists his recreations as "music, especially jazz and opera, hill-walking, sports, cinema". He is a football fan, and a member of Westfields Football Club.

See also
 Norman baronets
 Secretary to the Treasury

Notes

References

External links
 Jesse Norman MP official website
 Jesse Norman campaign website
 Profile at the Conservative Party
 
 
 Top 100 right wingers: 75–51 Iain Dale Daily Telegraph 26 Sep 2008
 Compassionate Economics
 Debrett's People of Today

|-

Living people
1962 births
People educated at Eton College
Alumni of Merton College, Oxford
Alumni of University College London
Academics of University College London
Conservative Party (UK) MPs for English constituencies
UK MPs 2010–2015
UK MPs 2015–2017
UK MPs 2017–2019
UK MPs 2019–present
Government ministers of the United Kingdom
Members of the Privy Council of the United Kingdom
Free Enterprise Group